Tael refers to several weight measures of the Far East.

Tael may also refer to:
 A character in The Legend of Zelda: Majora's Mask
 Texas Academy of Leadership in the Humanities, a high school in Beaumont, Texas, U.S.